Jens Arne Svartedal (born February 14, 1976) is a Norwegian former  cross-country skier who competed in the World Cup between 1999 and 2010. He represented Trøsken IL from Sarpsborg in Norway. His greatest achievement is winning the individual sprint gold medal at the 2007 FIS Nordic World Ski Championships in Sapporo. He also has a silver medal in the Team sprint event at the 2006 Winter Olympics in Turin.

Svartedal has seventeen cross-country victories since 2001, mostly in the sprint races. Two of those wins were in the sprint events at the Holmenkollen Ski Festival (2002, 2003).

Cross-country skiing results
All results are sourced from the International Ski Federation (FIS).

Olympic Games
 1 medal – (1 silver)

World Championships
 1 medal – (1 gold)

World Cup

Season standings

Individual podiums
 12 victories (12 ) 
 24 podiums (22 , 2 )

Team podiums
 4 victories (3 , 1 ) 
 12 podiums (8 , 4 )

References

External links
 
  
 
 

1976 births
Cross-country skiers at the 2002 Winter Olympics
Cross-country skiers at the 2006 Winter Olympics
Cross-country skiers at the 2010 Winter Olympics
Holmenkollen Ski Festival winners
Living people
Norwegian male cross-country skiers
Olympic cross-country skiers of Norway
Olympic silver medalists for Norway
Olympic medalists in cross-country skiing
FIS Nordic World Ski Championships medalists in cross-country skiing
Medalists at the 2006 Winter Olympics
People from Sarpsborg
Sportspeople from Viken (county)